Temnin el-Foka  is a village located approximately 28 kilometers southwest of Baalbek in the Baalbek District, in the Beqaa valley of Lebanon, at an altitude of 1100 meters above sea level. The village is famous for its Roman nymphaeum which is close to the spring of Ain el-Jobb.

History
Temnin was settled since Roman times, but the original name is unknown. The town is divided into two municipalities, the other being Temnine Et Tahta.

Ottoman tax registers from 1533–1548 indicate the village had 64 households and 11 bachelors, and one Imam, all Muslims.

In 1838, Eli Smith noted Temnin el-Foka's (or "Temnin the upper")  population as being predominantly  Metawileh.

The Roman nymphaeum 
It leads to a cistern underground. A gully has formed at the outflow, where a boundary pillar is carved with the image of a goddess. It resembles a similar cippus at Kafr Zabad.

The inner walls consist of four layers of massive, roughly hewn cuboids up to the vault. The top layer is completed by an unfinished cornice. At the rear end there is a slightly raised platform as Adyton. In the small semicircular niche on the back wall there must have been an image of the deity. It was probably a local deity of the flowing water, which can be seen on a stone slab in heavily weathered condition.

An ante was attached to the vaulted room in the form of an ante, which ended with an architrave with three fascias (horizontal stripes) and an upper bead. The staircase leads up in the middle between two columns with Corinthian capitals that bear the architrave. The porch is heavily restored, the rectangular portal was supplemented from concrete.

Only the vaulted arch and two rows of stones on the side walls were preserved before the restoration. The stone blocks of the side walls were piled up again, the pillars and capitals are largely new. Grooves can be seen in the longitudinal direction on the top of the vault. They may have served as a support for a wooden roof.

See also

Roman gardens
Temples of the Beqaa Valley

References

Bibliography

External links
 Temnine El Faouqa, Localiban

Archaeological sites in Lebanon
Roman sites in Lebanon
Tourist attractions in Lebanon
Populated places in Baalbek District
Shia Muslim communities in Lebanon